The Cherokee Flash is a 1945 American Western film directed by Thomas Carr. It is a Sunset Carson serial Western in which Carson works to free his father and clear the family name from a crime his father did not commit.

Plot 
Lawyer Butler, wanting Jeff Carson's ranch, has the Sheriff and his gang frame the bank holdup on him. Then they kill a witness that could free Carson and blame the murder on his son Sunset. But Sunset escapes, frees his father, and then sets a trap to catch the real killers.

Cast 
 Sunset Carson as Sunset Carson
 Linda Stirling as Joan Mason
 Tom London as Utah
 Roy Barcroft as Jeff Carson 
 John Merton as Mark "Blackie" Butler
 Bud Geary as Sheriff Baldwin
 Frank Jaquet as Doc Mason
 Fred Graham as Tom Stanton
 Joe McGuinn as Deputy Green
 Pierce Lyden as Clint Hawkins
 James Linn as Henchman Rand

References

External links 

1945 films
1945 Western (genre) films
American Western (genre) films
American black-and-white films
Republic Pictures films
Films directed by Thomas Carr
1940s English-language films
1940s American films